Héctor Alexis Gómez (born March 5, 1988) is a Dominican professional baseball infielder who is a free agent. He has played in Major League Baseball (MLB) for the Colorado Rockies and Milwaukee Brewers, and in the KBO League for the SK Wyverns.

Career

Colorado Rockies
Gómez began his professional career in 2006 after being signed by scout Felix Feliz. He split the season between the Casper Rockies (50 games) and Tri-City Dust Devils (two games), hitting a combined .312 in 62 games. In 2007, he played for the Asheville Tourists, hitting .266 with 11 home runs and 20 stolen bases in 124 games. He played in only one game in 2008, for the Modesto Nuts, collecting one hit in three at-bats. With the Nuts in 2009, Gómez hit .275 in 83 games.

He began the 2011 season with the Tulsa Drillers. Gómez was called up to the majors on September 16, 2011 and made his debut that night.

Milwaukee Brewers 
On June 28, 2012, he was claimed off of waivers by the Milwaukee Brewers, and was assigned to the Brevard County Manatees. Gómez spent the entire 2013 season with the Double-A Huntsville Stars. After playing the entire 2014 minor league season with the Triple-A Nashville Sounds, he was called up to the Brewers on September 2.

On May 4, 2015, Gómez hit his first career home run off of Los Angeles Dodgers starting pitcher Clayton Kershaw.

On August 7, 2015, Gómez was outrighted off of the 40-man roster after batting .181/.212/.323 in 134 plate appearances on the year. He elected free agency the next day.

San Diego Padres
On August 10, 2015, Gómez signed a minor league contract with the San Diego Padres organization and was assigned to the Triple-A El Paso Chihuahuas. On November 6, 2015, Gómez elected free agency.

SK Wyverns
On November 16, 2015, Gómez signed with the SK Wyverns of the Korea Baseball Organization. He batted .283/.324/.489 with 21 home runs and 62 RBI in 2016.

Philadelphia Phillies
On December 12, 2016, Gómez signed a minor league deal with the Philadelphia Phillies. He elected free agency on November 6, 2017 after spending the 2017 season in Triple-A with the Lehigh Valley IronPigs.

Guerreros de Oaxaca
On December 20, 2017, Gómez signed with the Guerreros de Oaxaca of the Mexican Baseball League. He was released on May 2, 2018.

High Point Rockers
On April 11, 2019, Gómez signed with the High Point Rockers of the Atlantic League of Professional Baseball. Gómez did not play in a game in 2020 due to the cancellation of the ALPB season because of the COVID-19 pandemic. He became a free agent following the season. 

After the 2020 season, he played for Panama in the 2021 Caribbean Series.

El Águila de Veracruz
On February 16, 2021, Gómez signed with El Águila de Veracruz of the Mexican League. He was released on January 19, 2022.

Generales de Durango
On February 4, 2022, Gómez signed with the Generales de Durango of the Mexican League. He was released on November 30, 2022.

References

External links

1988 births
Living people
Asheville Tourists players
Azucareros del Este players
Brevard County Manatees players
Casper Rockies players
Colorado Rockies players
Dominican Republic expatriate baseball players in Mexico
Dominican Republic expatriate baseball players in South Korea
Dominican Republic expatriate baseball players in the United States
El Águila de Veracruz players
El Paso Chihuahuas players
Estrellas Orientales players
Gigantes del Cibao players
Glendale Desert Dogs players
Guerreros de Oaxaca players
High Point Rockers players
Huntsville Stars players
Lehigh Valley IronPigs players
Major League Baseball second basemen
Major League Baseball shortstops
Major League Baseball third basemen
Major League Baseball players from the Dominican Republic
Mexican League baseball third basemen
Milwaukee Brewers players
Modesto Nuts players
Nashville Sounds players
Scottsdale Scorpions players
SSG Landers players
Tigres de Aragua players
Toros del Este players
Tri-City Dust Devils players
Tulsa Drillers players
Venados de Mazatlán players
Dominican Republic expatriate baseball players in Panama
Dominican Republic expatriate baseball players in Nicaragua